Rogério Lima Manganelli (born October 31, 1973), commonly known as  Roger  Lima, is an American musician, best known as the bassist and co-lead vocalist of the ska-punk band Less Than Jake. He also performs as the lead singer and rhythm guitarist of punk rock band Rehasher, and has another band called Greenhorn.

References

External links 

Moathouse Productions
Rehasher
Less Than Jake
Eden Amplification

1974 births
21st-century American male singers
21st-century American singers
21st-century American bass guitarists
American people of Brazilian descent
American punk rock bass guitarists
American male bass guitarists
American ska bass guitarists
American ska singers
Guitarists from Florida
Living people
Musicians from Tampa, Florida
Writers from Tampa, Florida